The Canadian Association of Journalists (CAJ) is an independent, not-for-profit organization that offers advocacy and professional development to journalists across Canada. The CAJ was created to promote excellence in journalism and to encourage investigative journalism in Canada. The CAJ presents annual investigative journalism awards, including the McGillivray Award and the Charles Bury Award.

History

The CAJ was founded in 1978 as the Centre for Investigative Journalism (CIJ). A few senior Canadian journalists founded the CIJ to counteract the isolation of the one or two reporters in the average newsroom who did investigative work. One of CIJ's initiatives was the Canadian Committee to Protect Journalists, a press freedom group that later became Canadian Journalists for Free Expression (CJFE). In 1990, the organization changed its name to its current form to reflect a broader emphasis on all journalism and attract additional members. Promoting investigate journalism remains one of the CAJ's main goals.

Awards

The Canadian Association of Journalists runs an annual awards program recognizing the best in Canadian journalism, with a focus on investigative journalism. Journalists whose works are published or broadcast in Canada may be nominated. Winners are announced during the organization's annual conference dinner.

Investigative journalism 
These categories recognize journalism in a variety of media as set out below. Entries don't have to be purely investigative to qualify; investigative entries are given added weight. Direction to judges include such items as effective use of the medium the entry was published or broadcast in, thoroughness of research, relevance and any outcomes arising from the entry's publication or broadcast. Items based on the same body of research, regardless of which medium they were released in, can only be entered in one category. Entries are awarded in the categories below, with the winner of the Don McGillivray Award for Investigative Journalism chosen from amongst these categories.

Open newspaper / wire service
Entries welcomed for any article published in a Canadian newspaper or wire service, regardless of circulation or publication frequency. Print articles published exclusively on newspaper websites are also eligible.

Community newspaper
Entries welcomed for any article published in a Canadian newspaper with an average circulation of under 25,000 or any newspaper published fewer than five times a week. Print articles published exclusively on newspaper websites are also eligible.

Magazine
Entries welcomed for any article published by a Canadian magazine. Print articles published exclusively on magazine websites are also eligible.

Open television (under five minutes runtime)
Entries welcomed for any piece broadcast on any Canadian station, with a runtime of under five minutes.

Open television (over five minutes runtime)
Entries welcomed for any piece broadcast on any Canadian station, with a runtime of over five minutes.

Regional television
Entries welcomed for any piece broadcast exclusively on a local or regional station.

Open radio news or current affairs
Entries welcome for any news or current affairs audio broadcast on any Canadian station, of any length.

CAJ / Marketwired data journalism
Entries welcome from any media in any format published or broadcast in Canada where data journalism / CAR techniques played a key and indispensable part in developing the story. This category is meant to highlight the use of data journalism, but not at the expense of good journalism and good storytelling.

General awards 
The following categories recognize exemplary journalism as laid out below. The winning entries in each of these categories is not eligible for consideration for the Don McGillivray award.

Photojournalism
Entries welcome showcasing a portfolio of up to 20 photographs demonstrating journalistic vision, consistent quality and a reflection of the entrant's professionalism and journalistic abilities.

Scoop
Entries welcome from any media in any format published or broadcast in Canada that can show how it was the first to bring new or significant information to light of regional or national importance.

Daily excellence
Entries welcome from print, radio and television journalists for items published or broadcast in Canada demonstrating excellence in daily, deadline-driven reporting based on same-day research.

Print feature
Entries welcome for any article published in a Canadian newspaper or magazine that is not specifically investigative in nature.

jhr / CAJ Award for Human Rights Reporting 
This prize rewards journalism that puts a human face on situations where
human rights are not respected and/or holds authorities to account to do a better job of protecting those rights. As a result, the story builds awareness of human rights and social justice issues, and shows the human impact and the human cost of abstract political and economic forces. To qualify, a story must also be international in scope.
For examples of human rights reporting, visit www.jhr.ca/success/
The details: The winner receives the opportunity to travel with jhr to one of its African project sites over 14 days. Travel (flights) to the site is provided by jhr, as is on-the-ground travel in the host nation. The CAJ provides the winner a $500 cash prize. The winner agrees to be responsible for covering pre-departure costs (visas, vaccinations, etc.) as well as accommodation costs while in Africa, which are booked in liaison with jhr (est. $1,000+). The winning entrant will have her/his registration fee to the 2013 CAJ conference waived and be invited to give a presentation sharing the award's experience with CAJ conference delegates.

CWA Canada / CAJ Award for Labour Reporting 
Judges will be instructed to reward those entries that effectively bring to the public's attention important labour issues. The award seeks to honour journalism that goes beyond a work-to-rule, strike, lockout or other job action and shows skill in reporting on the social, economic and political factors that impact the labour environment in Canada. Entries showing impact on policy, law or public awareness are encouraged. This award is meant to recognize great journalism on labour issues that can make a difference in the lives of Canadians.
Does an entry have to be reporting on a union? No– judges are looking for the best journalism on labour issues. While Canada's unions are integral to the labour movement, not all of the labour issues that are reported on in this country involve unions. It's expected many entries will include the labour movement and unions, but this is not a requirement of the award.
Entries are encouraged in either official language. Should the judges determine it appropriate, one award may be handed out for reporting done in English and another in French.

CAJ / CNW Group student award of excellence 
The award recognizes excellence in the field of journalism at the student level. Submissions will be accepted from all students enrolled (at the time of publication or broadcast) in an accredited degree/diploma program offered by a Canadian university or college.

In addition to awards for professional excellence, the CAJ presents a Code of Silence Award to celebrate "Canada's rich bureaucratic culture of secrecy."
At the 'Muck Rake 2004' conference in Vancouver in May, 2004, the federal government Health Canada department won its third Code of Silence award. Winners since then include the federal department of foreign affairs in 2008, Prime Minister Stephen Harper's office in 2009 and the Toronto Police Service in 2010.

Governance

The CAJ is governed by a board of directors, elected by chapters or through regional or national elections held prior to the annual meeting. Members of the board must be practising journalists as defined by the CAJ bylaws. Karyn Pugliese is president of the Canadian Association of Journalists (2018-2020) and previously sat on the CAJ Ethics Committee.

The 2015-16 board of directors:
President
Nick Taylor-Vaisey – National director
Maclean's Magazine

Vice-president
Sean Holman – Alta./N.W.T. regional director
Mount Royal University – Calgary

Chair
Dale Bass – B.C. / Yukon Region representative
Kamloops This Week – Kamloops, B.C.

Vice-chair
Jessy Akerley – Atlantic region representative
Coopérative Radio Restigouche Ltée (CIMS FM) – Balmoral, N.B.

Treasurer
Paul Schneidereit – National director
The Chronicle Herald – Halifax

Community manager
Laura Beaulne-Stuebing – National Capital Chapter rep
Ottawa

Past-president
Hugo Rodrigues
Standard-Freeholder – Cornwall, Ont.
613-330-8396

Directors
Mike Aiken – Manitoba / Northwestern Ontario regional director
Q104FM – Kenora, Ont.

Tim Alamenciak – Toronto chapter representative
TVO.org

James Cullingham – National director
Seneca College – Toronto

Andrea Hill – Sask. regional director
Saskatoon Star-Phoenix

Pat Martel – Atlantic region representative
CBC Radio – Charlottetown, PEI

Michel Remy – Quebec regional director
pi2.ca – Montreal

Manjeet Singh Atthwal – Quebec regional director
The Desi Times – Montreal

David Wiwchar – National director
93.3 The Peak, islandRADIO – Port Alberni, B.C.

Past presidents 
Term in Office

2015-2018 Nick Taylor-Vaisey

2011-2015 Hugo Rodrigues

2007-2011 Mary Agnes Welch

2003-2007 Paul Schneidereit

2001-2003 Robert Cribb

1999-2001 Boni Fox

1996-1999 Tom Arnold

1994-1996 Wendy McLellan

1992-1994 David Stewart-Patterson

1991-1992 Shirley Muir

1990 Julian Sher

1988-1990 Stephen Bindman

1988-1990; name changed to Canadian Association of Journalists (CAJ) 1990

1986-1988 Don McGillivray : Canadian Centre for Investigative Journalism (CIJ)

1985-1986 Nick Fillmore : Canadian Centre for Investigative Journalism (CIJ)

1983-1984 Wendy Jackson : Canadian Centre for Investigative Journalism (CIJ)

1982-1983 Harvey Schachter and Jean Dussault : Canadian Centre for Investigative Journalism (CIJ)

1978-1981 Jock Ferguson and Jean-Claúde Leclerc : Canadian Centre for Investigative Journalism (CIJ); co-chairs 1978-1979

References

External links
CAJ's official website
CJFE

Canadian journalism organizations
Canadian writers' organizations